Clara del Rey Calvo (1765 - 1808) was a Spanish war heroine. She was married to a soldier, Manuel González Blanco, and participated with her husband in the street fight battle of the Dos de Mayo Uprising in Madrid, where she was killed. Her two children was awarded a medal for her act. A street in Madrid is also named for her.

References 
 Correal y Freyre de Andrade, Narciso: La Coruña benéfica del siglo XVIII. Teresa Herrera. La Coruña: Ferrer, 1909.89

1765 births
1808 deaths
Women in 19th-century warfare
People of the Peninsular War